Circumambulation (from Latin circum around and ambulātus to walk) is the act of moving around a sacred object or idol.

Circumambulation of temples or deity images is an integral part of Hindu and Buddhist devotional practice (known in Sanskrit as pradakśiṇā). It is also present in other religions, including Christianity, Judaism, and Islam.

Hinduism

In many Hindu temples, the temple structure reflects the symbolism of the Hindu association of the spiritual transition from daily life to spiritual perfection as a journey through stages. Passageways for circumambulation are present through which worshipers move in a clockwise direction, starting at the sanctuary doorway and moving inward toward the inner sanctum where the deity is enshrined. This is a translation of the spiritual concept of transition through levels in life into bodily movements by the worshipers as they move inwardly through ambulatory halls to the most sacred centre of spiritual energy of the deity. It is done in a clockwise direction and in an odd rather than even number of times. Circumambulatory walking around the shrine, by keeping time, is a common form of Hindu prayer. The ambulatory pathway made of stone around the shrine is called the Pradakshina path.

Christianity
In the Catholic Church, a priest sometimes circumambulates an altar while incensing it with a thurible. Also, at some Catholic shrines, it is a tradition to circle the cult object of the place, usually relics of a saint or an image of Jesus or the Virgin Mary. Often this is performed three times, as a reference to the Trinity. In the Tridentine Rite the elements of Bread and Wine are also incensed before the Consecration by encircling them, twice counterclockwise, once clockwise. This incensing was accompanied with Latin prayer. 
In Romania, there is an Easter custom to process around the church three times by singing priests leading the people, just before finishing Easter Liturgy. It symbolizes the funerary procession of the burial of Jesus Christ.

Circumambulation is common in many Eastern Orthodox and Oriental Orthodox services. In the Coptic tradition, during the liturgy, the priest circles the altar while an acolyte (altar boy) holds a cross high on the opposite side.

This is also a common practice in Lutheran, Roman Catholic, Anglican and Methodist churches during Lent when Stations of the Cross services are celebrated.  The priest along with altar servers process around the interior of the church visiting each of the 14 stations.

On Palm Sunday in the churches of many Christian denominations, members of the congregation, oftentimes children, are given palms that they carry as they walk in a procession around the inside of the church. In the Church of Pakistan, a united Protestant Church, the faithful on Palm Sunday carry palm branches into the church as they sing Psalm 24.

Islam 

Tawaf (طواف) is one of the Islamic rituals of pilgrimage.  During the Hajj and Umrah, Muslims are to circumambulate the Kaaba (most sacred site in Islam) seven times, in a counter-clockwise direction. The circling is believed to demonstrate the unity of the believers in the worship of the One God, as they move in harmony together around the Kaaba, while supplicating to Allah.

Judaism
Judaism uses circumambulation in the Hakafot ritual during the Festival of Sukkot culminating in seven Hakafot on Hoshanah Rabbah, the end of the Festival. They are also performed during Hakafot on Simchat Torah, where Jews often dance circling the Torah Scrolls. Traditionally, Jewish brides circumambulate their grooms during the wedding ceremony under the chuppah and much Jewish dancing at weddings and Bar Mitzvahs is done by moving in a circle.

According to the Mishnah in Tractate Middot 2:2, when a person ascended to the Temple Mount in Jerusalem on the  Three Pilgrimage Festivals in the time of the Temple's existence, they would circumambulate counter-clockwise. Someone who had something bad happen to them would circumambulate clockwise so that when someone saw them going in this unusual direction the person could tell them what was wrong (i.e., they were a mourner or were excommunicated) and the person encountering them would pray for them in the name of "the One who dwells in this House."

Buddhism

Also called pradakṣina or caṅkramaṇa in Sanskrit.

Zen Buddhism
In Zen Buddhism, jundō (巡堂) can mean any ritual circuit or circumambulation. At Tassajara each morning, the officiating priest (導師 dōshi) visits four different altars on their way to the zendō, to make bows and offerings of incense. This jundō begins with the first rolldown of the han, and ends as the dōshi enters the zendō with the third rolldown. After offering incense and bowing at the altar, the dōshi walks around the zendō behind the meditators, in what is called the kentan (検単), inspection of the sitting platform. As the dōshi passes, each resident raises their hands in gasshō (合掌) without bowing. This joins the dōshi and sitters in mutual acknowledgement.

Sikhism

In Lavan Pheras, which is performed during wedding ceremonies, the four rounds of pheras symbolize a sacrosanct bond in the form of circumambulation of a purifying object, in this case the holy book, Sri Guru Granth Sahib.

Baháʼí Faith
Followers of the Baháʼí Faith perform circumambulation of both the Shrines of the Báb and Bahá'u'lláh during their lesser pilgrimage to Haifa and Bahjí, in Israel. While circumambulating, observance of these Manifestations of God is done in complete silence and also performed on holy days such as the birth and ascension of Bahá'u'lláh as well as the birth and martyrdom of the Báb.

Bön
The Bönpo in the Tibet traditionally circumambulate (generally) in a counter-clockwise direction, that is a direction that runs counter to the apparent movement of the Sun.

Freemasonry
Candidates for the three principle degrees of Freemasonry circumambulate the altar in the lodge room. It is done in a clock-wise fashion.  The number of times which candidates ambulate around the altar depends on which degree is being presented.

See also 
 Sunwise (clockwise)
 Widdershins (counter-clockwise)
 Circle dance
 Kora (pilgrimage)
 Parikrama
 Svastika
 Sauvastika
 Stupa

References 

Ritual
Walking

pl:Pradakszina
ru:Парикрама